Michel Frederic DeGraff is a Haitian creolist who has served on the board of the Journal of Haitian Studies. He is a tenured professor at the Massachusetts Institute of Technology and a founding member of the Haitian Creole Academy.  His field of scholarship is Creole language, also known as Lang Kreyòl Linguistics. He is known for his advocacy towards the recognition of Haitian Creole as a full-fledged language. In the fall of 2012, he received a $1 million grant from the National Science Foundation to introduce online Creole language materials in the teaching of STEM in Haiti. He believes that Haitian children should be taught in their native language at all levels of instruction, contrary to the tradition of teaching them in French. Degraff believes that instruction in French, a foreign language for most Haitian children, hinders their creativity and their ability to excel.

Early life
As a child growing up in a middle-class Haitian family and attending a top school where the instruction was in French, Degraff reports that despite being a top student, he often felt that French was a hindrance as not speaking it well caused complexes of inferiority among otherwise bright children. He remembers believing that he spoke one and a half languages, Haitian Creole being the "half", when in fact the language that all children spoke well by default was Creole. He recalls that French, although imposed at home and at school, was never used for jokes or on the soccer field.

Education
Dr. DeGraff holds a PhD in computer science from the University of Pennsylvania. Prior to his PhD, he studied computer science at City College of New York. He arrived at City College from Haiti in 1982. He developed an interest in linguistics during an internship at Bell Labs in New Jersey in 1985.

Work in Haiti
Dr. Degraff currently works with introducing ICT to Haitian children being instructed in Creole at the Matènwa school in La Gonâve.  The children are encouraged to use Google Translate to read what is available on the web in languages other than Creole. With a National Science Foundation grant, he is also using computer games in Creole to teach them math skills.

See also
 Akademi Kreyòl Ayisyen

References

External links
 Platfòm MIT-Ayiti Open access repository of Creole teaching materials 
 Official Website

Living people
Haitian academics
Linguists from Haiti
Linguists of pidgins and creoles
City College of New York alumni
University of Pennsylvania alumni
MIT School of Humanities, Arts, and Social Sciences faculty
Computational linguistics
1963 births
Linguists of Haitian Creole